Twelve teams qualified for the women's field hockey at the 2020 Summer Olympics . Each of the Continental Champions from five confederations received an automatic berth. Japan as the host nation qualified automatically. In addition, the remaining six nations will be determined by an Olympic qualification event. As hosts Japan also won the Asian Games title, a seventh quota place was added to the Olympic qualification event.

Table

 – Japan qualified both as the hosts and the continental champions, therefore that quota is added to the FIH Olympic Qualifiers rather than going to the runners-up of the tournament.

2018 Asian Games

The champion of the women's field hockey tournament at the 2018 Asian Games qualifies for the Olympics. If Japan is the winner, the quota place is added to the qualification events rather than going to the runner-up.

Qualified teams

Preliminary round

Pool A

Pool B

Final round

Final ranking

2019 Pan American Games

Qualified teams

Preliminary round

Pool A

Pool B

Classification round

2019 African Olympic Qualifier

Teams

Pool

2019 EuroHockey Championship

Qualified teams

Preliminary round

Pool A

Pool B

Final round

Final ranking

2019 Oceania Cup

Pool

Olympic qualifying events

Originally, twelve teams were to take part in the Olympic Qualifiers. These teams were to be drawn into six pairs; each pair playing a two-match, aggregate score series. The winner of each series qualified for the Olympics. As Japan won the 2018 Asian Games (thereby qualifying twice, once as host and once as Asian champions), there were 14 teams, seven of whom qualified.

Qualification

Matches

See also
Field hockey at the 2020 Summer Olympics – Men's qualification

Explanatory notes

References

 
Women
Field hockey at the Summer Olympics – Women's qualification
Qualification